André Nel (born 15 July 1977) is a former South African cricketer who played all formats as a fast bowler. Since retired from international arena, he played county cricket for Surrey. He announced his retirement from international cricket on 25 March 2009.

Domestic career
After the 2007 Cricket World Cup, carrying a highly aggressive and respected reputation, Nel joined the English County of Essex, making his debut for the 2005 and 2006 Pro 40 Champions against the side he first experienced the English game with, Northamptonshire.

Nel has been signed by Mumbai Indians, an Indian Premier League franchise. He joined the Mumbai Indians as a replacement to West Indian cricketer, Dwayne Bravo, who returned home for national duty after the game against Deccan Chargers on 18 May 2008.

International career

In January 2005 against England he took 6/81 in the first innings of the Test. These remained his best innings bowling figures until South Africa's tour of the West Indies in April 2005 when in the 3rd Test at Kensington Oval he took 6/32 to go with his first innings 4 wickets. This gave him his first 10 wicket haul in Test cricket and he was subsequently named man of the match.

Nel went on to take 14 wickets during his side's tour of Australia later in 2005, finishing the year with 36 victims at 20.72.	

He has constantly troubled Brian Lara in Test cricket, having dismissed him on 8 occasions.

In the first test of the Bank Alfalah Test Series versus Pakistan in Karachi, Nel became the 11th South African to reach the milestone of 100 dismissals in Test cricket, when he dismissed the Pakistani nightwatchman, Mohammad Asif on 5 October 2007.

In early 2008, paceman of colour Charl Langeveldt was controversially selected in the Test team for tour of India, at the expense of Nel. This was widely believed to be due to an order from Cricket South Africa to select more non-white players in the team as part of its transformation policy, rather than performance. Langeveldt declined his selection, citing the controversy over the selection, and Nel was reported to have been considering retirement.

Controversies
Nel has been involved in controversies both on and off the field and he has been fined for a number of ICC Code of Conduct breaches during his career.

In February 2001 he hit the headlines after bursting into tears when he felled Allan Donald with a fiery bouncer in a domestic first-class match. It emerged later that he had been following instructions from his coach Ray Jennings to target Donald. Later in the year during the tour of the West Indies he, along with four other teammates, was found guilty of smoking marijuana.

During 2003 he was sent home from a South Africa A tour of Australia after being pulled over for drunk driving.
During the 2005 Boxing Day Test match at the Melbourne Cricket Ground he was the subject of racial taunts, in Afrikaans, from fans in Bay 13.

His enthusiastic and aggressive approach on the field also gets him into trouble and he was notably brought before the match referee for making offensive facial gestures to Chris Gayle and subsequently fined half of his match fee. He is also known to be verbally aggressive towards batsmen.

Often referred to as a gentle giant off the field, Nel has attributed his eccentric onfield behaviour to his alter ego an oxygen starved mountain man known as Gunther.

On 1 October 2010, Nel attempted suicide.

Personal life
On 17 January 2004, Nel got married during the second day of the fourth Test against the West Indies.

References

External links

 

1977 births
Living people
Easterns cricketers
Essex cricketers
Northamptonshire cricketers
Titans cricketers
Mumbai Indians cricketers
South Africa One Day International cricketers
South Africa Test cricketers
South Africa Twenty20 International cricketers
South African cricketers
Cricketers at the 2007 Cricket World Cup
Afrikaner people
Sportspeople from Germiston
South African cricket coaches